Ahamb, also spelled Axamb or Akhamb is an Oceanic language spoken in South Malakula, Vanuatu.

Ahamb has around 1000 speakers, most of whom reside on the small low-lying Ahamb Island and the nearby Malekula mainland. The language is endangered due to a number of factors, including climate change and environmental factors.

Linguist Tihomir Rangelov published a grammatical description of Ahamb in 2020.

The language

Phonology
Ahamb’s phonology is characterised by distinctive prenasalisation in its plosives and trills. There are four contrastive trills, including the typologically rare plain bilabial trill. 

The vowel inventory is also relatively large compared to other related languages, with eight contrastive vowels.

Grammar
Nouns in Ahamb are classified as common, personal and local. They can also be classified as alienable and inalienable, which corresponds to a structural distinction in possessive constructions involving classifiers (general and alimentary) or direct suffixation respectively. Noun phrases consist of a nominal head and various modifiers that follow it in a relatively flexible order.

Verbs in Ahamb can be transitive and intransitive. Intransitive verbs are further classified as active or stative. Detransitivisation is possible with the use of prefixation or reduplication. Verbs can take a number of prefixed tense/aspect/mood/polarity modifiers and commonly feature a subject index. Subject indexes come in three paradigms with forms for all person, number and clusivity distinctions. Neutral subject indexes are used in a variety of situations and combine most freely with other preverbal modifiers. Sequential event subject indexes are used to mark the second and subsequent verb in complex clauses that encode sequential events with the same subject. Irrealis mood subject indexes are used in interrogatives and negative modality constructions, among others. The objects of transitive verbs can be encoded by an object pro-index, which can take four different forms.

Ahamb has SVO word order. Negation can be expressed in a number of ways, including a separate prohibitive coding and a negative modality particle. Different verb-like forms can function as prepositions and deixis markers. Complementation can be expressed with or without a complementiser, corresponding to a distinction in the semantic properties of the complement taking verb. Verb serialisation has been attested on the nuclear and core level. A special type of nuclear serialisation-like construction involves coverbs – non-prototypical verb forms that are only attested in such constructions. On the core level, switch-function and ambient serialisation is attested. Subordination is possible with a large variety of conjunctions. Other complex clause types include sequential event constructions and both syndetic and asyndetic coordinating constructions.

Resources
A collection of Ahamb texts is available with open access at the Endangered Languages Archive.

References and links

References

External links
Axamb resources in the OLAC Language Catalog
Axamb resources in WorldCat
The Story of the Reef Numbur in Ahamb and English
Ahamb phrases and texts, 1999

Malekula languages
Languages of Vanuatu